Edye Graning is an American Democratic politician who was elected to the Vermont House of Representatives in 2022. From 2020 to 2022 she served as chair of the Mount Mansfield Unified Union School District board.

References

Living people
21st-century American politicians
Democratic Party members of the Vermont House of Representatives
Year of birth missing (living people)